Baba Jani may refer to:
Baba Jani-ye Abd ol Mohammad
Baba Jani-ye Bala
Baba Jani-ye Shah Morad
Baba Jani (TV series), a Pakistani drama serial that premiered in 2018